Aeolian commonly refers to things related to either of two Greek mythological figures:

 Aeolus (son of Hippotes), ruler of the winds
 Aeolus (son of Hellen), son of Hellen and eponym of the Aeolians
 Aeolians, an ancient Greek tribe thought to be descended from Aeolus, son of Hellen

Aeolian or Eolian may also refer to:

Music
 Aeolian (album), an album by German post-metal band The Ocean Collective
 Aeolian Company (1887–1985), a maker of organs, pianos, sheet music, and phonographs
 Aeolian Hall (disambiguation), any one of a number of concert halls of that name
 Aeolian harp, a harp that is played by the wind
 Aeolian mode, a musical mode, the natural minor key
 Aeolian Quartet (1952–1981), a string quartet based in London
 Aeolian-Skinner (1932–1972), pipe organ builder

Other uses
 Aeolian dialect, a dialect of Ancient Greek
 Aeolian Islands, islands in the Tyrrhenian Sea, named after Aeolus the ruler of the winds
 Aeolian or Aeolic order, an early order of Classical architecture
 Aeolian processes, eolian sedimentation, wind-generated geologic processes
 Eolian (Solar car), a solar car designed at the University of Chile

See also
 
 
 Eolianite, a sandstone formed from wind-transported sediment
 Aeolia (disambiguation)
 Aeolic, the Ancient Greek dialect of the Aeolians 
 Aeolus (disambiguation)
 Eolienne (also spelled aeolian), a lightweight fabric similar to poplin